Cramahe is a rural township located in Northumberland County in central Ontario, Canada. It is situated just off Ontario Highway 401 approximately 140 km East of Toronto. It was named for Hector Theophilus de Cramahé, who was Lieutenant-Governor of the Province of Quebec. The township's seat and largest town is Colborne.

History
Joseph Keeler opened a store on the site of present-day Colborne about 1819. A community began to grow as other small businessmen followed suit. With the opening of harbour facilities in the 1840s and the arrival of the railway in 1840, Colborne became an important service centre for the region. Cramahe was incorporated as a township in 1850. In 1858, the Village of Colborne seceded from the municipality as a separate township. In 2001, both municipalities were reamalgamated to form an expanded Township of Cramahe.

Communities
The township of Cramahe comprises a number of communities, including the following communities such as Castleton, Colborne, Dundonald, East Colborne, Edville, Greenleys Corners, Griffis Corners, Loughbreeze, Morganston, Purdy Corners, Salem, Shiloh, Tubbs Corners, Victoria Park; Banford Station, Browns Corners, Ogden Point, Spencer Point, Victoria Beach

Colborne
Originally named Keeler's Creek, Colborne is the largest and main population centre of the township. It was named after Sir John Colborne, Lieutenant Governor of Upper Canada, by Joseph Abbott Keeler in 1829. Colborne was incorporated as a village in 1858 with a population of approximately 700 people. In 2001, Colborne and Cramahe Township were amalgamated as part of municipal restructuring to form an expanded Township of Cramahe.

Colborne is the home of the Big Apple, a tourist attraction located along Ontario Highway 401. There is an observation deck on top of the apple, a restaurant and other amenities on the premises.

Demographics 

According to the Canada 2011 Census:
Mother tongue:
 English as first language: 92.4%
 French as first language: 0.9%
 English and French as first language: 0.2%
 Other as first language: 6.5%

Notable people
Israel Wood Powell - Colborne born Member of The House of Assembly of Vancouver Island and British Columbia's First Superintendent of Indian Affairs
Marcus A. Kemp - Colborne born member of the Wisconsin State Senate
Charles Smith Rutherford - Colborne born recipient of the Victoria Cross for actions at the Battle of the Scarpe during the First World War
William Arthur Steel
Ed Greenwood

See also
List of townships in Ontario

References

External links

Township municipalities in Ontario
Lower-tier municipalities in Ontario
Municipalities in Northumberland County, Ontario